Young Wolfhound is a 2006–2007 Russian adventure fantasy TV series, a prequel to the 2006 film Wolfhound. Series was loosely based on the novels by Maria Semyonova about Wolfhound's young life.

Cast 
 Aleksandr Bukharov as Wolfhound
 Anna Azarova as Viliya
 Elvira Bolgova as Neya
 Nataliya Dogadina as Kendrat
 Andrei Chadov as Kattai
 Pavel Abdalov as Gvalior
 Yegor Barinov as Lyudoed
 Mikhail Evlanov as Wolf
 Oleg Fomin as Svaltyga
 Andrei Kharitonov as Debtor
 Liubomiras Lauciavicius as Warlock
 Alexander Loio as Stinky
 Galina Petrova as Kattai's Mother
 Maxim Shishkov as Young Wolf
 Yegor Timpunik as Young Wolfhound
 Leonid Timtsunik as Tzeregat
 Aleksandr Yatsko as Tirgei
 Aleksandr Loye as Stinky

External links 
 

NTV (Russia) original programming
2000s Russian television series
2006 Russian television series debuts
2007 Russian television series endings
Russian fantasy television series
Russian television miniseries